Steven N. Gelbs (born February 1, 1987) is an American sportscaster and sports reporter who covers the New York Mets for SNY.

Early life and education
Steven N. Gelbs was born to Scott H. and Robin A. Gelbs on February 1, 1987, in Rego Park, Queens. He grew up in Greenwich, Connecticut. He has two younger brothers, Jared and Adam; they were raised in Reform Judaism. In the 1990s, when Steve was growing up, his father served as a physical therapist for the New York Rangers NHL team. Gelbs became a fan of the Rangers, attending Rangers games in part due to his father's position with the team. In his youth, Gelbs was also a fan of the New York Yankees. Gelbs' uncle operated a dry cleaning business; among his customers was Tom Seaver, who provided the young Gelbs with an autograph, made out to "Little Steven." Gelbs graduated with a BA from the Newhouse School of Public Communications at Syracuse University.

Career
Gelbs began his career broadcasting at MSG Varsity, later moving on to MSG, where he served as the host of MSG 150 during New York Knicks and New York Rangers telecasts. Gelbs joined SNY in 2013. His first assignment involved covering a Brooklyn Cyclones game for the network. For the 2014 season, Gelbs filled in for Kevin Burkhardt for 50 games, leading to him replacing Burkhardt beginning in the 2015 New York Mets season as Burkhardt left for Fox Sports. In 2009, Gelbs won the Syracuse Press Club award for "Best Radio Sports Feature." He has also been nominated for four New York Emmy Awards, including "Sports Anchor of the Year" in 2012.
Gelbs, along with fellow broadcasters Keith Hernandez, Gary Cohen, and Ron Darling, won the 2019 Sterling Award for best broadcasting booth in the MLB.

Personal life
On November 21, 2015, Gelbs married Julie Straus, whom he had proposed to in 2014. He has two children, born in 2019 and 2021.

References

American radio sports announcers
Jewish American sportspeople
Living people
Major League Baseball broadcasters
National Hockey League broadcasters
New York Rangers announcers
New York Mets announcers
Sportspeople from Greenwich, Connecticut
People from Rego Park, Queens
Sportspeople from Queens, New York
1987 births
20th-century American Jews
21st-century American Jews
American Reform Jews
S.I. Newhouse School of Public Communications alumni